Passiflora roseorum is a species of plant in the family Passifloraceae. It is endemic to Ecuador.

References

roseorum
Endemic flora of Ecuador
Vulnerable flora of South America
Taxonomy articles created by Polbot